Escola Portuguesa de Moçambique - Centro de Ensino e Língua Portuguesa (EPM-CELP) is a Portuguese international school in Maputo, Mozambique. The school is operated by the Portuguese Ministry of Education and serves from Pre-school up to Grade 12.

It opened for the 1999–2000 school year, and was created from the Decree-Law No. 241/99 of 25 June promoting Cooperation between the Portuguese Republic and the Republic of Mozambique. This was modified by Decree-Law n.º 47/2009 of 23 February.

The school's symbol is of a tree within  green and red portico. The tree roots represent the school's educational philosophy and are a reference to some verses from works of Luís de Camões.

In the future, the EPM will be the regulatory academy for the Mozambican dialects of the Portuguese language.

References

External links
  
  Decreto-Lei n.º47/2009 (Archive). Diário da República, 1.ª série — N.º 37 — 23 de Fevereiro de 2009. p. 1248-1255.

Schools in Maputo
Portuguese international schools in Mozambique
1999 establishments in Mozambique
Educational institutions established in 1999